Rohin Francis is a British cardiologist, writer, comedian, and creator of the YouTube channel Medlife Crisis. He is working toward a PhD on imaging techniques for acute myocardial infarction. Throughout the COVID-19 pandemic, Francis has created content that has looked to educate the public about medicine.

Early life and education 
Francis attended medical school at St George's in London, and he trained as a physician at the Cambridge Deanery in Cambridge. He specialises in cardiology.

Career

University 
Francis is a PhD student at University College London, where he is studying the use of magnetic resonance imaging (MRI) as a means to image acute myocardial infarction.

Science communication 
Francis is a science communicator, with a following of over 500,000 on his YouTube channel Medlife Crisis. In the midst of the COVID-19 pandemic, Francis started creating more serious YouTube videos, and has since discussed issues such as coronavirus disease, systemic racism and pseudoscience. In an interview with Men's Health, Francis described why and how people needed to remain positive whilst acknowledging the seriousness of coronavirus disease. He said that it was appropriate for coronavirus disease-related YouTube videos to be demonetised as it could mitigate the spread of misinformation.

Public research 	
Francis has argued against the private ownership and licensing of publicly-funded research. He criticised companies such as Elsevier for their high profit margins, earned by licensing primary research. He has also publicly supported Alexandra Elbakyan, the creator of the website Sci-Hub, for her efforts to make research more accessible.

Academic publications 

 

Francis has also written for The Conversation, the journal The Medical Student, and The Guardian.

External links 

Rohin Francis' channel on YouTube

References 

Living people
Year of birth missing (living people)
British cardiologists
English people of Indian descent
Alumni of University College London